The Volkswagen emissions scandal, sometimes known as Dieselgate or Emissionsgate, began in September 2015, when the United States Environmental Protection Agency (EPA) issued a notice of violation of the Clean Air Act to German automaker Volkswagen Group. The agency had found that Volkswagen had intentionally programmed turbocharged direct injection (TDI) diesel engines to activate their emissions controls only during laboratory emissions testing, which caused the vehicles'  output to meet US standards during regulatory testing. However, the vehicles emitted up to 40 times more  in real-world driving. Volkswagen deployed this software in about 11 million cars worldwide, including 500,000 in the United States, in model years 2009 through 2015.

Background

Introduction 
In 2013, the International Council on Clean Transportation (ICCT) commissioned the West Virginia University Center for Alternative Fuels Engines and Emissions (WVU CAFEE) to test on-road emissions of diesel cars sold in the U.S. Researchers at WVU CAFEE, who conducted live road tests in California using a Japanese on-board emission testing system, detected additional nitrogen oxide emissions from two out of three tested vehicles, both made by Volkswagen. In May 2014, ICCT published WVU CAFEE's findings and reported them to the California Air Resources Board (CARB) and the United States Environmental Protection Agency (EPA).

In September 2015, the EPA announced that Volkswagen had violated the Clean Air Act by installing illegal software into their diesel vehicles. Regulators in multiple countries began to investigate the automaker, and its stock price fell in value by a third in the days immediately after the news. Volkswagen Group CEO Martin Winterkorn resigned, and the head of brand development Heinz-Jakob Neusser, Audi research and development head Ulrich Hackenberg, and Porsche research and development head Wolfgang Hatz were suspended. Volkswagen announced plans in April 2016 to spend  ( at April 2016 exchange rates) in relation to the scandal, and agreed in June 2016 to pay up to $14.7 billion to settle civil charges in the United States. In January 2017, Volkswagen pleaded guilty to criminal charges and signed an agreed Statement of Facts, which set out how the company's management asked engineers to develop the defeat devices, because its diesel models could not pass US emissions tests without them, and deliberately sought to conceal their use. In April 2017, a US federal judge ordered Volkswagen to pay a $2.8 billion criminal fine for "rigging diesel-powered vehicles to cheat on government emissions tests". Winterkorn was charged in the United States with fraud and conspiracy on 3 May 2018. , the scandal had cost VW $33.3 billion in fines, penalties, financial settlements and buyback costs. Various government and civil actions are currently undergoing in the U.S., as well as the European Union, where most of the affected vehicles are located; while they remain legal to drive there, consumers groups and governments seek to make sure Volkswagen has compensated these owners appropriately as they had to do in the United States.

The scandal raised awareness over the higher levels of pollution emitted by all diesel-powered vehicles from a wide range of car makers, which under real-world driving conditions exceeded legal emission limits. A study conducted by ICCT and ADAC showed the biggest deviations from Volvo, Renault, Jeep, Hyundai, Citroën and Fiat, resulting in investigations opening into other diesel emissions scandals. A discussion was sparked on the topic of software-controlled machinery being generally prone to cheating, and a way out would be to open source the software for public scrutiny.

and Volkswagen Diesel anti-pollution system
In general, diesel engines have better fuel efficiency and less carbon dioxide emission than petrol engines, but they emit 20 times more nitrogen oxide unless somehow treated, and catalytic converters, which have been very effective at reducing  in petrol engine exhaust, do not function well for them. As  are harmful air pollutants, regulators in the United States and Europe have implemented increasingly stringent  emission standards for passenger cars since the early 2000s.

To deal with this problem, in 2005 Volkswagen licensed Mercedes' urea-based "selective catalytic reduction (SCR)" system called BlueTec for future diesel engine development. While effective at reducing , an SCR system like Bluetec was expensive, high-maintenance and required more space than other methods, making it unsuitable for Volkswagen's compact cars such as Golf or Jetta. Some managers at Volkswagen rejected BlueTec, and preferred to develop their own inexpensive "lean  trap" system. In 2007, Volkswagen canceled the licensing deal for BlueTec and announced that it would use its own pollution control technology.

Volkswagen chose the "lean  trap" system for its turbo-diesel Golf and Jetta models, but the solution did not work well as it required a fuel-rich exhaust gas in the purification process and fuel economy suffered as a result. Nonetheless, the company promoted the technological miracle of fast, cheap, and green diesel vehicles – but the impression projected to outsiders did not reflect the reality.
In reality, the system failed to combine lower fuel consumption with compliant  emissions, and Volkswagen chose around 2006 to program the Engine Control Unit (ECU) to switch from lower fuel consumption and high  emissions to low-emission compliant mode when it detected an emissions test, particularly for the EA 189 engine. This caused the engine to emit  levels above limits in daily operation, but comply with US  standards when being tested, constituting a defeat device. In 2015 the news magazine Der Spiegel reported that at least 30 people at management level in Volkswagen knew about the deceit for years, which Volkswagen denied in 2015.

Starting in the 2009 model year, Volkswagen Group began migrating its light-duty passenger vehicle's turbocharged direct injection (TDI) diesel engines to a common-rail fuel injection system. This system allows for higher-precision fuel delivery using electronically controlled fuel injectors and higher injection pressure, theoretically leading to better fuel atomization, better air/fuel ratio control, and by extension, better control of emissions.

Volkswagen described the diesel engines as being as clean as or cleaner than US and Californian requirements, while providing good fuel economy and performance. 
The low emissions levels of Volkswagen vehicles tested with the defeat device in operation enabled the company to receive green car subsidies and tax exemptions in the US.

Underlying U.S. and EU emission standards

The Volkswagen and Audi cars identified as violators had been certified to meet either the US EPA Tier 2 / Bin 5 emissions standard or the California LEV-II ULEV standard. Either standard requires that nitrogen oxide emissions not exceed  for engines at full useful life which is defined as either  or  depending on the vehicle and optional certification choices.

This standard for nitrogen oxide emissions is among the most stringent in the world. Defeat devices are forbidden in the EU. The use of a defeat device is subject to a penalty.

Nature reported in 2015 that 20 percent of European city dwellers were exposed to unhealthy levels of nitrogen dioxide, and that in London, where diesel road traffic was responsible for 40 percent of  emissions, 3,000 deaths per year could be attributed to air pollution. A Channel 4 documentary in January 2015 referred to the UK government moving to a  emission band system for road tax, which favoured diesel power, as the "great car con", with Barry Gardiner MP, former member of the Blair government, stating that the policy, which lowered  emissions yet increased  pollution, was a mistake.

Early warnings 1998–
In 1998, a Swedish researcher criticized the New European Driving Cycle standard for allowing large emission differences between test and reality. The Washington Post also reported that in the late 1990s, EPA engineers at Virginia Testing Laboratory had built a system called ROVER, designed to test a car's emissions on the road. The project was shut down in 2001, despite preliminary tests indicating gaps between emissions from lab tests and real world tests of about 10 to 20 percent.

In 2011, the European Commission's Joint Research Centre published a report which found the average on-road  emission of all tested diesel vehicles to be 0.93 ± 0.39 g/km, and that of tested Euro 5 diesel vehicles to be 0.62 ± 0.19 g/km. Those numbers substantially exceeded the respective Euro 3–5 emission limit. In 2013, the research center then warned:

The European Commission and European governments could not agree upon who was responsible for taking action. In the United Kingdom, the Department for Transport received a report from the International Council on Clean Transportation (ICCT) in October 2014, which stated there was a "real world nitrogen oxides compliance issue" with diesel passenger cars. Respirable suspended particles with a diameter of 10 micrometres – also known as PM10 (including diesel particulates) – halved since 1996 despite the increased number and size of diesel cars in the UK.

ICCT's emission testing, 2013–14 
In late 2012, the independent body International Council on Clean Transportation (ICCT) was seeking proposals from research facilities to study on-road emissions of so-called "clean diesel" cars sold in the US. Researchers at West Virginia University's Center for Alternative Fuels Engines and Emissions (WVU CAFEE) submitted a proposal to ICCT, and were awarded a US$70,000 grant for a study where they had to test US-spec diesel vehicles with two different emission reduction technologies: lean  trap (LNT) and selective catalyst reduction (SCR). John German, co-lead of the US branch of ICCT, said the idea for this "very ordinary" test came from Peter Mock, managing director ICCT in Europe, and they chose to put US vehicles through on-the-road tests because their emissions regulations are more stringent than those in the European Union. The ICCT expected the cars to pass, and thought they would be able to use the results to demonstrate to Europeans that it was possible to run diesel cars with cleaner emissions.

In early 2013, researchers at WVU CAFEE began testing emissions from the three diesel cars: a Volkswagen Passat, a Volkswagen Jetta, and a BMW X5, on the road in California. They wanted to test a Mercedes as well, but could not obtain one. They used a portable emissions measurement system, making it possible to collect real world driving emissions data, for comparison with laboratory dynamometer testing. The three vehicles were all certified at a California Air Resources Board facility before the tests as falling below the emissions limits when using the standard laboratory testing protocols. They put  on the Jetta and X5. The BMW was "at or below the standard … with exception of rural-up/downhill driving conditions". But the researchers found that under real-world driving conditions the Jetta exceeded US emissions limits "by a factor of 15 to 35" while the Passat exceeded the limit "by a factor of 5 to 20".

The emissions far exceeded legal limits set by both European and US standards. One of the testers said, "... we did so much testing that we couldn't repeatedly be doing the same mistake again and again." John German said the deceit required more effort than merely adding some code to the engine software, as the code would also have to be validated. The US test results confirmed the ICCT's findings in Europe. ICCT also purchased data from two other sources. The new road testing data and the purchased data were generated using Portable Emissions Measurement Systems (PEMS) developed by multiple individuals in the mid-late 1990s and published in May 2014. The West Virginia scientists did not identify the defeat device, but they reported their findings in a study they presented to the EPA and CARB in May 2014. In May 2014 Colorado's RapidScreen real-world emissions test data reinforced the suspected abnormally high emissions levels. After a year-long investigation, an international team of investigators identified the defeat device as a piece of code labelled "acoustic condition" which activated emissions-curbing systems when the car's computer identified it was undergoing a test.

EPA Notice of Violation, 2015 
On 18 September 2015, the US EPA served a Notice of Violation (NOV) of the Clean Air Act on Volkswagen Group alleging that Volkswagen and Audi automobiles equipped with 2-litre TDI diesel engines, and sold in the US between 2009 and 2015, had an emissions-compliance "defeat device" installed, and ordered a recall of 482,000 vehicles. A Notice of Violation is a notification to the recipient that the EPA believes it has committed violations and is not a final determination of liability.

Volkswagen's "defeat device" is specially-written engine-management-unit firmware that detects "the position of the steering wheel, vehicle speed, the duration of the engine's operation, and barometric pressure" when positioned on a dynamometer using the FTP-75 test schedule. These criteria very closely match the EPA's required emissions testing protocol which allowed the vehicle to comply with emissions regulations by properly activating all emissions control during testing. The EPA's NOV alleged that under normal driving conditions, the software suppressed the emissions controls, allowing better fuel economy, at the expense of emitting up to 40 times more nitrogen oxides than allowed by law.

Intelligence agencies, 2015 
In February 2017, Der Spiegel reported that in February 2015, ex Israeli diplomat Avi Primor had shown Ferdinand Piëch, then Volkswagen chairman of the board at the time, a document in which US agencies warned CEO Martin Winterkorn early about the manipulation. During this meeting at the end of February 2015, Primor introduced Piëch to his friend Yuval Diskin, who after retiring from directing the Israeli secret service of the Interior Shin Bet, had founded a cybersecurity company. Shin Bet apparently knew about the scandal early. Primor confirmed that the meeting took place, but both Primor and Diskin denied tipping off Piech. In early March 2017, Piech asked Winterkorn whether there had been a warning by US agencies, which Winterkorn denied.

Volkswagen's response

Initial response August, September 2015 

According to the EPA, Volkswagen had insisted for a year before the outbreak of the scandal that discrepancies were mere technical glitches. Volkswagen fully acknowledged that they had manipulated the vehicle emission tests only after being confronted with evidence regarding the "defeat device".

The first sign that Volkswagen was ready to come clean reportedly occurred on 21 August 2015 at a conference on green transportation in Pacific Grove, California, where an unnamed company representative approached Christopher Grundler, director of the EPA Office of Transportation and Air Quality, and surprised him by informally admitting that the company had been deceiving regulators. A CARB official was standing next to Grundler at the time.

Formal acknowledgement of the deception was made by Volkswagen executives in Germany and the United States to EPA and California officials during a 3 September conference call, during which Volkswagen executives discussed written materials provided to the participants demonstrating how Volkswagen's diesel engine software circumvented US emissions tests. That admission came after the EPA threatened to withhold approval for the company's 2016 Volkswagen and Audi diesel models.

Volkswagen's CEO Martin Winterkorn said: "I personally am deeply sorry that we have broken the trust of our customers and the public." Winterkorn was in charge at Volkswagen from the start of 2008 to September 2015. He attributed the admitted wrongdoing to "the terrible mistakes of a few people". Winterkorn initially resisted calls to step down from his leadership role at VW, but then resigned as CEO on 23 September 2015.

Volkswagen Group of America CEO Michael Horn was more direct, saying, "We've totally screwed up." Horn added, "Our company was dishonest with the EPA, and the California Air Resources Board and with all of you." Olaf Lies, a Volkswagen board member and economy minister of Lower Saxony, later told the BBC that the people "who allowed this to happen, or who made the decision to install this software" acted criminally, and must be held personally accountable. He also said the board found out about the problems only "shortly before the media did", and expressed concerns over "why the board wasn't informed earlier about the problems when they were known about over a year ago in the United States".

Volkswagen announced that 11 million cars were involved in the falsified emission reports, and that over seven billion dollars would be earmarked to deal with the costs of rectifying the software at the heart of the pollution statements. The newly appointed CEO of Volkswagen Mathias Müller stated that the software was activated in only a part of those 11 million cars, which has yet to be determined. The German tabloid Bild claimed that top management had been aware of the software's use to manipulate exhaust settings as early as 2007. Bosch provided the software for testing purposes and warned Volkswagen that it would be illegal to use the software to avoid emissions compliance during normal driving. Der Spiegel followed Bild with an article dated 30 September 2015 to state that some groups of people were aware of this in 2005 or 2006. Süddeutsche Zeitung had similarly reported, that Heinz-Jakob Neusser, one of Volkswagen's top executives, had ignored at least one engineer's warnings over "possibly illegal" practices in 2011.

On 28 September 2015, it was reported that Volkswagen had suspended Heinz-Jakob Neusser, head of brand development at its core Volkswagen brand, Ulrich Hackenberg, the head of research and development at its brand Audi who oversees technical development across the Volkswagen group, and Wolfgang Hatz, research and development chief at its sports-car brand Porsche who also heads engine and transmissions development of the Volkswagen group. On the same day it was reported that besides the internal investigation of the incidents, the supervisory board of Volkswagen had hired American law firm Jones Day to carry out an independent investigation. Computerworld suggested that a software audit trail and test logs were ways to investigate what took place when. In February 2016 Volkswagen also contracted three public relations firms (Kekst in the United States, Hering Schuppener in Germany, Finsbury in Britain), in addition to its usual US-retained firm Edelman. To further help deal with the scandal, Volkswagen hired ex-FBI director Louis Freeh, alongside former German constitutional judge Christine Hohmann-Dennhardt previously employed by Daimler, and as of 2016 on Volkswagen's board as its director of integrity and legal affairs.

Other irregularities, November 2015

emissions
On 3 November 2015, Volkswagen revealed that its internal investigation found that  emissions and fuel consumption figures were also affected by "irregularities". On 9 December 2015, Volkswagen revised these estimates, saying that only around 36,000 vehicles are affected by the irregularities, while also affirming that it had found no evidence of unlawful changing of  emissions data. The news prompted a 7.3 percent increase in Volkswagen preference shares on the same day.

In November 2016, California regulators claimed to have discovered software installed on some Audi models that allowed the manufacturer to cheat  emissions during standard testing, thereby also masking the cars' contribution to global warming.

3.0 litre TDI emissions 
On 20 November 2015, the EPA said Volkswagen officials told the agency that all 3.0-litre TDI diesel engines sold in the US from 2009 through 2015 were also fitted with emissions-cheating software, in the form of "alternate exhaust control devices". These are prohibited in the United States, however the software is legal in Europe. Volkswagen acknowledges these devices' existence, but maintains that they were not installed with a "forbidden purpose". On 4 January 2016, the US Department of Justice filed a complaint in a federal court against VW, alleging that the respective 3.0-litre diesel engines meet the legal emission requirements in only a "temperature conditioning" mode that is automatically switched on during testing conditions, while at "all other times, including during normal vehicle operation, the vehicles operate in a 'normal mode' that permits  emissions of up to nine times the federal standard". The complaint covers around 85,000 3.0 litre diesel vehicles sold in the United States since 2009, including the Volkswagen Touareg, Porsche Cayenne, Audi A6 Quattro, Audi A7 Quattro, Audi A8, Audi A8L, Audi Q5, and Audi Q7 models.

Affected Volkswagen and Audi TDI models 

*Initial Modification

**Subsequent Modification

Vehicle recall and consequences 
On 29 September 2015, Volkswagen announced plans to refit up to 11 million affected vehicles, fitted with Volkswagen's EA 189 diesel engines, including 5 million at Volkswagen brand, 2.1 million at Audi, 1.2 million at Škoda and 1.8 million light commercial vehicles. SEAT said that 700,000 of its diesel models were affected. In Europe alone, a total of 8 million vehicles are affected. In Germany, 2.8 million vehicles will have to be recalled, followed by the UK, with 1.2 million. In France, 984,064 vehicles were affected, in Austria around 360,000, while in the Czech Republic 148,000 vehicles were involved (of which 101,000 were Škodas). In Portugal, Volkswagen said it had sold 94,400 vehicles with the software. The repair may not require a formal recall; in the UK, for example, the company will simply offer to repair the cars free of charge; a recall is required only "when a defect is identified that... could result in serious injury". As the rules violation involved enabling emission controls during testing, but turning it off under normal conditions to improve performance or fuel mileage, it has been speculated that the software update might make cars perform less efficiently and impair fuel economy; according to VW, however, its proposed solutions will be designed to achieve legal EU emissions compliance without impairing engine performance or consumption.

 it was unclear whether the repair would include hardware modifications, such as selective catalytic reduction (SCR) upgrades. The recall was scheduled to start in January 2016, with all affected cars projected to be fixed by the end of the year. The company also announced a review of all of its brands and models, including its supercar marque Bugatti.

On 8 October 2015, Volkswagen US CEO Michael Horn said in testimony before the US Congress that it could take years to repair all the cars, especially the older models, due to the required complex hardware and software changes. He said that the fixes would likely preserve fuel economy ratings but, "there might be a slight impact on performance".

On 12 October 2015, Paul Willis, Volkswagen UK managing director, told the Commons Transport Select Committee that about 400,000 Volkswagen cars in the UK will need fuel injectors altered as well as a software fix. The vehicles requiring the hardware fix are the 1.6 litre diesel models. The 1.2 litre and 2.0 litre diesel models will require only a software fix.
On the same day, Volkswagen announced it would overhaul its entire diesel strategy, saying that in Europe and North America it will switch "as soon as possible" to the use of selective catalytic reduction technology to improve diesel emissions. It also announced plans to accelerate the development of electric cars and plug-in hybrids, as well as petrol, instead of diesel engines for smaller cars.

On 12–13 October 2015, Volkswagen Group vehicle drivers in the UK started receiving notification letters, to "rectify the issue". Volkswagen later announced a timeline for UK diesel recalls, citing March 2016 for 2.0-litre engines, June 2016 for 1.2-litre engines, and October 2016 for 1.6-litre engines.

At the beginning of October 2015, Volkswagen suggested to let car owners decide whether their cars would be recalled for handling. However, the German Federal Motor Transport Authority (Kraftfahrt-Bundesamt, or KBA) views the software as illegal, and has ordered a full recall of all affected cars in Germany. Volkswagen then decided to recall around 8.5 million cars in Europe, about a third of all its car deliveries since 2009. KBA requires Volkswagen to send a recall plan to KBA before the end of October for 2.0-litre cars, and end of November for 1.2 and 1.6-litre cars. If KBA approves a plan, Volkswagen can then start handling the cars. The German authorities require that Volkswagen remove the software and that Volkswagen ensures that emission rules are fulfilled. Media estimates that the KBA procedure sets a precedent for how authorities in other countries handle the case.

On 18 November 2015, Autoblog reported that the KBA was reviewing a Volkswagen fix for the affected 1.6 diesel engine. On 25 November 2015, Volkswagen said the fix involved a minor hardware modification to the car's air intake system, alongside a software update. This low-cost solution contradicted earlier speculation regarding the possible fitting of new injection nozzles and catalytic converters. In December 2015, Volkswagen said that the affected 1.2-litre and 2.0-litre diesel engines needed only a software update. As of November 2015, the KBA had approved the fixes with the first recalls likely to begin in January 2016. According to VW, the measures aimed to achieve legal EU emissions compliance without impairing engine output, fuel consumption, or performance. The simple fixes with inexpensive parts and software were then possible though not available when the engines were developed, because engine technology understanding and intake flow simulation capabilities had matured in the meantime, to address the burning of diesel and air mixtures via intake flow shaping. As of December 2015, due to stricter environmental legislation, fixes for US vehicles were expected to take longer to produce and be more technically complex.

As of February 2016, there were three sizes of affected diesel engines, and more than a dozen variations to the repairs exist, prompting Volkswagen to roll out the recalls in waves for each cluster of vehicle; the first model to be repaired was the low-volume Volkswagen Amarok. Classified as a light commercial vehicle, the Amarok pickup has a higher Euro 5  emissions limit than the passenger cars that are yet to have an available approved fix. German motoring journal Auto Motor und Sport tested two Amarok TDI pickups pre and post software update and found that whilst engine power had remained the same, fuel consumption had increased by 0.5 litres/100 km. This is believed in turn to have delayed the next wave of updates to the larger volume Passat model which had been expected to start on 29 February 2016 due to the further testing of the update by the KBA. Volkswagen confirmed on 11 April 2016 that the Passat recall would be delayed as testing had revealed higher fuel consumption. In 2017 Swedish auto journal Teknikens Värld performed tests on 10 different models and most of them showed a reduction in power output and increase in fuel consumption after having the update applied.

Advertising, 2015 
In France, the MediaCom media agency, which buys advertising for Volkswagen, warned the French newspapers on 22 September 2015 that it would cancel planned Volkswagen and Audi campaigns in case they would cover the emission violations. Given the scale that the scandal had already taken by that time, the threat had little effect on its coverage.

On the occasion of German Unity Day, Volkswagen launched an ad campaign in German Sunday newspapers, that it wanted to express its joy about the 25th anniversary of German reunification, its pride about having shaped the country together with all people for the last 25 years, to give thanks for the confidence of the customers it had experienced during all this time and that it wanted to thank all its employees and trade partners in Germany, and that in one sentence, that "it would do everything to win back the confidence of its customers".

New orders, September 2015 
In September 2015, Volkswagen's Belgian importer, D'Ieteren, announced that it would offer free engine upgrades to 800 customers who had ordered a vehicle with a diesel engine which was likely to have been fitted with illegal software.

As of October 2015, Sales of vehicles with EA 189 engines were halted in some European countries, including Spain, Switzerland, Italy, the Netherlands, Belgium and the UK.

In the United States, Volkswagen withdrew its application for emissions certification for its 2016 diesel models, leaving thousands of vehicles stranded at ports in October 2015, which the company said contained software which should have been disclosed to and certified by the EPA. EPA quarantined some 2016-models until it would become clear that their catalysts perform the same on the road as they do in tests.

US Congressional Testimony, October 2015

On 8 October 2015, Volkswagen US CEO Michael Horn testified before the United States House Committee on Energy and Commerce stating: "This was not a corporate decision, from my point of view, and to my best knowledge today. This was a couple of software engineers who put this in for whatever reason... some people have made the wrong decisions in order to get away with something that will have to be found out." The response was widely ridiculed.

Compensation, November 2015  
On 9 November 2015, Volkswagen announced that, in addition to the US$2,000 it was offering current Volkswagen owners for trade-ins, 482,000 diesel Audi and Volkswagen owners in the United States would be eligible to receive US$1,000 in vouchers. On 18 November 2015, Volkswagen said that approximately one quarter of the affected vehicle owners had applied to the program, which was estimated to cost at least $120 million in benefits. Volkswagen confirmed that it is offering vouchers including to customers in Canada. Volkswagen America said that accepting the gift cards does not prevent owners from filing lawsuits. Volkswagen also created a claims fund that was managed by internal Volkswagen teams in conjunction with a third party claims administrator, following successful negotiations between Volkswagen, EPA, DOJ, FTC and the consumer class action attorneys. In addition an alternative claims fund was considered as a mechanism to encourage the class action settlement, to be managed by the well-known mediation attorney Kenneth Feinberg, but ultimately was not used.  The claims fund offered full compensation packages (in the form of cash, buy-backs, repairs or replacement cars) to the approximately 600,000 United States owners affected by the scandal. Despite earlier hints to the contrary, in December 2015 Volkswagen CEO Matthias Müller said that customers outside the US and Canada should also expect some type of compensation package: "we are working on an attractive package, let's call it compensation, for reduction in residual values in our cars". However, on 11 January 2016, a Volkswagen spokesman said "there won't be compensation. All the indications are that residual values are unaffected"; the company, which continued to face pressure from E.U. officials to compensate European drivers as well, blamed the confusion on "a slight mistranslation". E.U. commissioner Elżbieta Bieńkowska said Volkswagen was treating European consumers unfairly, and Volkswagen responded that the situation in US and Canadian markets, where confidence in diesel technology was "severely shaken" and clients needed to wait longer for an engine fix due to tougher emissions standards, was not "automatically comparable" with other markets.

On 21 April 2016, the federal district court for the Northern District of California, which was appointed in December 2015 to oversee almost all of the US litigation, including claims filed by vehicle owners and state governments, announced that Volkswagen would offer its US customers "substantial compensation" and buy back nearly 500,000 2.0-litre vehicles as part of a settlement in North America. The court appointed former FBI Director Robert Mueller as a mediator to oversee the negotiations between claimants, regulators, and Volkswagen, to produce a final "consent decree" by late June 2016.

European actions, 2015–2020 
Following its admission and recall plans in the United States, Volkswagen also started to establish similar plans in the European Union, where it was estimated that 8.5 million of the 11 million diesel vehicles affected by the scandal were located. The European Union warned Volkswagen in 2018 that it did not believe it was moving fast enough to issue repairs on the recalled cars, provide consumers with appropriate information on what steps Volkswagen was doing to resolve the problem, and what compensation they were offering affected consumers. Volkswagen agreed to a  fine imposed by Germany for failing to monitor the employees that modified the software behind the scandal in 2018.

In Germany, over 60,000 civil lawsuits of various degrees representing about 450,000 citizens were filed from 2015 through 2019 by Volkswagen owners, seeking similar compensation as Volkswagen had given to United States drivers. A case led by the Federation of German Consumer Organizations (VZBV) was brought against Volkswagen. At the Braunschweig Oberlandesgericht (Higher Regional Court) Volkswagen argued that where the United States had banned the affected cars, no EU member state had banned the affected vehicle, and thus there was no basis for any compensation. However, Judge Michael Neef rejected a summary judgement for Volkswagen in September 2019, allowing what was anticipated to be a multi-year case to go forward. Many consumers were angered over this settlement, representing only a fraction of what Volkswagen had paid to United States' owners. One of the other civil cases, serving as a template for those not covered by the VZBV case, had reached the Federal Court of Justice, Germany's highest court, and in May 2020, ruled that the consumer was entitled to the full market value of the car, several times larger than what the settlement would have offered. It is unclear how much Volkswagen will own from a result of the remaining civil lawsuits.

A similar class-action suit against Volkswagen representing more than 91,000 owners is currently underway in the United Kingdom, seeking greater compensation for being sold vehicles known by Volkswagen to be defective. The High Court of Justice had giving preliminary findings in the case in April 2020 that there is a likelihood that Volkswagen did sell vehicles with a "defeat device" and attempted to abuse the process, allowing the trial to go forward.

Consequences

Health consequences

Deaths 
A peer-reviewed study published in Environmental Research Letters estimated that approximately 59 premature deaths will be caused by the excess pollution produced between 2008 and 2015 by vehicles equipped with the defeat device in the United States, the majority due to particulate pollution (87 percent) with the remainder due to ozone (13 percent). The study also found that making these vehicles emissions compliant by the end of 2016 would avert an additional 130 early deaths.

Earlier non peer-reviewed studies published in media sources, quoted estimates ranging from 10 to 350 excess deaths in the United States related to the defeat devices based on varying assumptions.

A 2022 study by economists found that each cheating Volkswagen car per 1,000 cars caused a low birth weight rate increase of 1.9 percent and infant mortality rate increase by 1.7 percent.

Non-fatal health impacts 
Since  is a precursor to ground-level ozone it may cause respiratory problems "including asthma, bronchitis and emphysema". Nitrogen oxides amplify the effect of fine particulate matter soot which causes heart problems, a form of air pollution estimated to kill 50,000 in the United States annually.

A peer-reviewed study published in Environmental Pollution estimated that the fraudulent emissions would be associated with 45 thousand disability-adjusted life years (DALYs) and a value of life lost of at least 39 billion US dollars.

In June 2016, Axel Friedrich, formerly with the German equivalent of the E.P.A. and a co-founder of the International Council on Clean Transportation stated "It's not just fraud – it's physical assault."

Environmental consequences 

Legal and financial repercussions

Government actions

Australia 
In October 2015, the Australian Competition & Consumer Commission announced that it will not be investigating Volkswagen for possible violations of emissions standards, citing that a reasonable consumer would not be concerned about the tailpipe emissions of their vehicle and hence would not be a deciding factor in their purchase. In March 2017, the Sydney Morning Herald reported that Audi and Volkswagen issued a voluntary recall for affected cars for software updates and in some cases hardware updates had begun in December 2016. , several class action suits were dropped against Volkswagen, Audi and Skoda.

In December 2019, Volkswagen was fined  for making false and misleading representations about compliance with Australian diesel emissions standards.

Belgium 
In October 2015, the Belgian Chamber of Representatives set up a special Dieselgate committee. It finalized a consensus report in March 2016, for the government to implement recommendations, with near-unanimous approval on 28 April 2016.

In January 2016, public broadcaster VRT reported on Opel Zafira cars having lower emissions after an update compared to before receiving the update. Opel denied deploying software updates influencing emissions, and the Economic Inspection of the Federal Government started an investigation on the request of Minister of Consumer Protection Kris Peeters.

Brazil 
As of October 2015, Volkswagen Brazil confirmed that 17,057 units of its Amarok mid-size pickups produced between 2011 and 2012 and sold in Brazil were equipped with the emissions cheating software.

In September 2017, Volkswagen Brazil was ordered to pay  to the 17,000 owners of the Amarok pickups equipped with defeat devices, as decided by the 1st Business Court of the Court of Justice of Rio de Janeiro. The automaker may still appeal the decision. The total amount reaches  ( at the September 2017 exchange rate) and each consumer will receive  for material damages and another  for moral damages. In addition, the magistrate ordered the automaker to pay an additional  into the National Consumer Protection Fund. According to the judge, the purpose was "to compensate the Brazilian society as a collective moral damage of a pedagogical and punitive nature because of the collective fraud caused in the domestic motor vehicle market".

Canada 
In September 2015, Environment Canada announced that it had begun an investigation to determine if "defeat devices" were installed in Volkswagen vehicles to bypass emission control tests in Canada.
On 15 December 2016 an agreement was reached which allowed buybacks or trade-ins based on market value on 18 September 2015 or fitting an approved emissions modification.

Ontario provincial authorities executed a search warrant at Volkswagen Canada offices in the Toronto area on 19 September 2017 as part of its investigation into the emissions scandal that rocked the company two years ago. The Ministry of the Environment and Climate Change have charged Volkswagen AG with one count under the province's Environmental Protection Act, alleging the German company did not comply with Ontario emission standards. The allegations have not been proven in court.

In July 2018, Volkswagen Group Canada announced plans for its new Electrify Canada subsidiary to launch a network of public fast-charging stations in major cities and along major highways, starting with 32 charging sites in the four most-populated provinces: Ontario, Quebec, British Columbia and Alberta.

On 9 December 2019, Volkswagen AG was charged with 60 counts of contravening the Canadian Environmental Protection Act, 1999. On 22 January 2020, Volkswagen pleaded guilty to all charges and was fined .

China 
In October 2015, China's General Administration of Quality Supervision, Inspection and Quarantine announced the recall of 1,946 imported Tiguan SUVs and four imported Passat B6 sedans, in order to fix the emissions software problems.

European Union 
In September 2015, Government regulatory agencies and investigators initiated proceedings in France, Italy, Germany, Switzerland, Spain, the Netherlands, the Czech Republic and Romania. Several countries called for a Europe-wide investigation. In October 2015 Werner Hoyer, President of the European Investment Bank (EIB) said the bank was considering recalling Volkswagen loans, and announced their own investigation into the matter. On 27 October 2015, the European Parliament voted a resolution urging the bloc to establish a federal authority to oversee car-emissions, following reports in the press that top EU environmental officials had warned, since early 2013, that manufacturers are tweaking vehicles to perform better in the lab than on the road. The resolution urged for tougher emissions tests to be fully implemented in 2017, instead of being phased in between 2017 and 2019, as had been originally planned. However, the European Commission proceeded with passing legislation that allowed the car industry an extra year before having to comply with the newer regulation. Also, it was revealed that the new "realistic" EU driving emissions test will continue to allow cars to emit more than twice the legal limit of nitrogen oxides from 2019 and up to 50 percent more from 2021. The legislation, opposed only by the Netherlands, is considered a great victory for the car industry, and has drawn stern critique from other MEPs. Dutch MEP Bas Eickhout referred to the new test as "a sham", while liberal democrat MEP Catherine Bearder described the legislation as "a disgraceful stitch-up by national governments, who are once again putting the interests of carmakers ahead of public health". In December 2015, the EU Parliament voted to establish a special committee to investigate whether regulators and executive officials, including the European Commission, failed to oversee the car industry and its pollution testing regimes.

In June 2016, documents leaked to the press indicated that in 2010, European Commission officials had been warned by their in-house science team that at least one car manufacturer was possibly using a -related defeat device in order to bypass emission regulation. Kathleen Van Brempt, the chair of the EU inquiry into the scandal, found the documents "shocking" and suggested that they raised serious concerns with regard to the future of commission officials: "These documents show that there has been an astonishing collective blindness to the defeat device issue in the European commission, as well as in other EU institutions".

In September 2020, European union laws changed and the European commission has the right to check car conformity to emission standards and to recall vehicles when needed.

France 
Renault and Peugeot's headquarters were raided by fraud investigators in January and April 2016, respectively. As of January 2016, Renault recalled 15,000 cars for emission testing and fixing. French authorities opened an inquiry in March 2016 into Volkswagen over the rigging of emission tests, with prosecutors investigating suspicions of "aggravated deception".

Germany 
In September 2015 former Volkswagen chief executive Martin Winterkorn resigned over the scandal, saying he had no knowledge of the manipulation of emissions results. One week later German prosecutors launched an investigation against him. On 1 October a German prosecutor clarified, it was looking into allegations of fraud from unidentified individuals, but that Winterkorn was not under formal investigation. On 8 October 2015 police raided Volkswagen headquarters. As of 16 October 2015, twenty investigators worked on the case, targeting "more than two, but a lot fewer than 10" Volkswagen staff. As of November 2015 the Kraftfahrt-Bundesamt KBA tested 50 cars from different manufacturers, both in laboratory and on-road with PEMS. In May 2016, German transport minister Alexander Dobrindt said that Volkswagen, Audi, Mercedes-Benz, Opel and Porsche would all adjust settings that increased emission levels such as nitrogen dioxide in some diesel cars. On 16 March 2017, German authorities raided the headquarters of Audi in Bavaria and Volkswagen in Wolfsburg.

On 15 April 2019 Winterkorn and four other executives were charged by prosecutors in Braunschweig, Germany.

Audi's then CEO Rupert Stadler was taken into German custody in June 2018 until being released in October 2018, when he was also removed from being CEO. In July 2019, Stadler was charged with fraud in Munich due to the scandal.

Hong Kong
The Hong Kong Environmental Protection Department banned the Volkswagen Caddy on 16 October 2015. As of 16 October 2015 the department had also tested the Amarok and Transporter commercial diesel vehicles but found them to be free of the defeat device.

India 
, the Indian government directed the Automotive Research Association of India (ARAI) to investigate whether Volkswagen's vehicles had circumvented Indian laws and regulations on vehicle emission testing. On 22 September 2015 the Indian Foundation of Transport, Research and Training (IFTRT) demanded a probe into Volkswagen's Confirmation of Production process for vehicles sold in India. In October the Government of India later extended its deadline for the test results to the end of October 2015. On 11 January 2017, ARAI's investigation into defeat devices was published and revealed that Volkswagen India had installed a derivation of the software used in the U.S. to defeat emission testing procedures in all of the Volkswagen group's product range in India with EA 189 engine series. This included  1.2-L, 1.5-L, 1.6-L and 2.0-L diesel engine variants across three different brands – Audi, Skoda and Volkswagen. The report called the defeat device "not a product failure but a clear case of cheating".

Italy 
On 6 October 2015 Italy's regulator of competition announced plans to investigate whether Volkswagen engaged in "improper commercial practices" when promoting its affected diesel vehicles. On 15 October 2015, Italian State Police raided Volkswagen offices in Verona, and Volkswagen's Lamborghini offices in Bologna, placing six executives under investigation.

Japan 
In October 2015, Japan's Ministry of the Environment held an expert committee meeting to discuss this issue.
There were 36 targeted cars which had been privately imported, although they were not sold through authorized resellers in Japan.

Netherlands 
In December 2016 the Dutch consumers authority ACM decided to investigate whether Dutch laws were broken and consumers misled, a report was due by June 2017. 5,000 Dutch Volkswagen owners have signed up for a class action lawsuit. Netherlands has spent billions of euros on subsidies in energy-efficient cars in the recent years. Jesse Klaver from the political party GroenLinks responded that the Netherlands must claim back money from the car manufacturers if it emerges that they have committed fraud in the Netherlands.

Norway 
Norway's prosecutors opened a criminal investigation into possible economic crimes committed by VW.

In May 2016, Norway's sovereign wealth fund, the world's largest ($850 bn) and also one of the company's biggest investors, announced legal action against Volkswagen, to be filed in Germany as part of a class-action lawsuit being prepared there.

Romania 
On 1 October 2015 the Romanian Automotive Register (RAR) stopped issuing registration documents for Volkswagen vehicles equipped with Euro 5 diesel engines.

South Africa 
On 28 September 2015, the departments of Environmental Affairs and Transport and the National Regulator for Compulsory Specifications said they still needed to determine whether local cars had been affected by the rigging of US vehicle emissions tests.

South Korea 
As of 19 January 2016 South Korea, the world's eighth-largest diesel-car market, planned a criminal case against Volkswagen executives. On 22 September 2015 South Korean authorities announced pollution control investigations into cars manufactured by Volkswagen and other European car-manufacturers. Park Pan-kyu, a deputy director at South Korea's environment ministry said: "If South Korean authorities find problems in the Volkswagen diesel cars, the probe could be expanded to all German diesel cars".

As of 20 January 2016, the country's environmental agency had filed criminal charges against VW, seeking up to $48 billion in penalties. Volkswagen's recall plan for South Korea, submitted on 6 January 2016, was rejected by the authorities, as it failed to meet a number of key legal requirements. Authorities are also reported to have rejected a revised plan on 23 March 2016 for the same reasons. In May 2016, following a wider investigation of 20 diesel-powered cars, South Korean authorities accused Nissan of using a defeat device for manipulating emissions data for the British-built Nissan Qashqai, allegations which the Japanese carmaker denied.

In August 2019, the government announced a ban on 8 VW Group diesel models cars for cheating emissions regulations.

Spain 
As of 28 October 2015, a Spanish court had opened a criminal probe against Volkswagen AG, to establish whether the company's actions broke any local laws.

Sweden 
As of 29 September 2015, Sweden's chief prosecutor was considering starting a preliminary investigation into Volkswagen's emissions violations.

Switzerland 
On 26 September 2015 Switzerland banned sales of Volkswagen diesel cars, marking the most severe step taken so far by a government in reaction to the emissions crisis.

United Kingdom 
The Department for Transport announced on 24 September 2015 that it would begin re-testing cars from a variety of manufacturers to ensure the use of "defeat devices" was not industry wide. The UK Parliamentary Transport Select Committee opened an enquiry into Volkswagen Emissions Violations with evidence sessions on 12 October 2015 and 25 January 2016. The Select Committee published a letter from Paul Willis, managing director of Volkswagen Group UK Ltd of 21 December 2015 stating: "In very simple terms, the software did amend the  characteristics in testing. The vehicles did meet EU5 standards, so it clearly contributed to meeting the EU5 standards in testing".

A report on "real world" tests commissioned by the Government published in April 2016 showed emissions from 37 diesel engines up to 14 times higher than had been claimed, with every vehicle exceeding the legal limit of nitrogen oxide emissions. Only Volkswagen group vehicles were found to have test cycle detection software.

In January 2017, an action group announced it had 25,000 vehicle owners who were seeking compensation of £3,000–4,000 per vehicle.

In May 2022, VW UK settled UK class action claims from around 90,000 drivers, totalling £193m, without admitting liability. Due to time limitations, Dieselgate victims not part of this group litigation will unlikely be able to now make a claim.

United States 

VW suspended sales of TDI-equipped cars in the US on 20 September 2015. In addition to possible civil fines, the United States Department of Justice Environment and Natural Resources Division were doing a criminal probe of Volkswagen AG's conduct. 22 September 2015 The United States House Energy Subcommittee on Oversight and Investigations announced that it would hold a hearing into the Volkswagen scandal while New York Attorney General Eric Schneiderman said that his investigation was already underway. As of 29 October 2015, over 25 other states' attorneys general, and the Federal Bureau of Investigation in Detroit, were involved in similar investigations. On 12 November 2015, the FBI confirmed to engineering magazine Ingeniøren that it had an ongoing investigation, after previous unconfirmed reports.

As of 6 October 2015, the EPA decided to broaden its investigations onto 28 diesel-powered models made by BMW, Chrysler, General Motors, Land Rover and Mercedes-Benz. The agency would initially focus on one used vehicle of each model, and widen the probe if it encountered suspicious data. The EPA has described the hidden Volkswagen pollution as "knowing endangerment". In May 2016, the owners of Mercedes-Benz confirmed that the US Justice Department asked Daimler AG to run an internal investigation into its diesel emissions testing, as well.

On 4 January 2016, the Justice Department, on behalf of the EPA, brought suit against Volkswagen in the United States District Court for the Eastern District of Michigan in Detroit. The complaint, seeking up to $46 billion in penalties for Clean Air Act violations, alleged that Volkswagen equipped certain 2.0 and 3.0-litre diesel-engine vehicles with emissions cheating software, causing  pollution to exceed EPA's standards during normal driving conditions. It further claimed that Volkswagen entities provided misleading information and that material omissions impeded and obstructed "efforts to learn the truth about the (excess) emissions". while "so far recall discussions with the company have not produced an acceptable way forward". On 9 January 2016, US officials criticized Volkswagen for citing German law in order to withhold documents from a group of states investigating the company's actions. Schneiderman also complained over Volkswagen's slowness in producing documents from its US files, claiming the company "has sought to delay responses until it completes its 'independent investigation' several months from now".

On 12 January 2016, US regulators rejected Volkswagen's recall plans for its affected 2.0-litre diesel engines, submitted to CARB in December 2015, claiming that these "do not adequately address overall impacts on vehicle performance, emissions and safety". Volkswagen confirmed that its discussions with CARB will continue, and said that the company is working on bringing "a package together which satisfies our customers first and foremost and then also the regulators". The states of Arizona, West Virginia, New Mexico, and Texas, as well as Harris County, Texas, all filed separate lawsuits seeking restitution from VW. The company also faces investigations by 48 United States state attorneys.

On 29 March 2016, Volkswagen was additionally sued by the United States Federal Trade Commission for false advertising due to fraudulent claims made by the company in its promotion of the affected models, which touted the "environmental and economic advantages" of diesel engines and contained claims of low emissions output. The suit was consolidated into existing litigation over the matter in San Francisco, which would allow the FTC to participate in global settlements over the matter.

The Ninth U.S. Circuit Court of Appeals ruled on 1 June 2020 that Volkswagen was liable for further legal damage lawsuits brought by state and local governments in the emissions fraud. The unanimous ruling by the court paved the way for two counties in Florida and Utah to proceed with litigation against Volkswagen, as well as potential further cases brought by jurisdictions in the US. By June 2020, VW had already expended $33.3 billion in settlements and other costs including buybacks of the excessively polluting diesel vehicles. In a statement, VW said it would ask the circuit court to review the ruling, and that the company if necessary would take the case to the U.S. Supreme Court.

Charges against Volkswagen engineering/management 
On 9 September 2016, James Robert Liang, a Volkswagen engineer working at Volkswagen's testing facility in Oxnard, California, admitted as part of a plea deal with the US Department of Justice that the defeat device had been purposely installed in US vehicles with the knowledge of his engineering team: "Liang admitted that beginning in about 2006, he and his co-conspirators started to design a new "EA 189" diesel engine for sale in the United States. ... When he and his co-conspirators realized that they could not design a diesel engine that would meet the stricter US emissions standards, they designed and implemented [the defeat device] software".

On 7 January 2017, former top emissions compliance manager for Volkswagen in the US Oliver Schmidt was arrested by the FBI on a charge of conspiracy to defraud the United States. On 11 January 2017 Volkswagen pleaded guilty to weaving a vast conspiracy to defraud the US government and obstructing a federal investigation and agreed to pay a US$2.8 billion criminal fine and US$1.5 billion in civil penalties. In addition, six executives have been criminally charged.

On 3 May 2018, former Volkswagen CEO Martin Winterkorn was indicted on fraud and conspiracy charges in the emissions scandal case. He has repeatedly denied any knowledge of the rigged emissions tests.

Settlement 
On 25 October 2016, a final settlement was approved by a judge. About 475,000 Volkswagen owners in the US were given the choice between a buyback or a free fix and compensation, if a repair becomes available. Volkswagen will begin administering the settlement immediately, having already devoted several hundred employees to handling the process. Buybacks range in value from $12,475 to $44,176, including restitution payments, and vary based on mileage. People who opt for a fix approved by the Environmental Protection Agency will receive payouts ranging from $5,100 to $9,852, depending on the book value of their car.

Of the buyback, 138,000 had been completed by 18 February 2017 with 150,000 more to be returned. 52,000 chose to keep their cars. 67,000 diesel cars from model year 2015 were cleared for repairs, but left uncertainty about the future of 325,000 "Generation One" diesel VWs from the 2009–2014 model years, which use the "lean  trap" and would be harder to repair.

In March 2018, Reuters reported that 294,000 cars from the buyback program have been stored at 37 regional US staging sites; some of the first reported sites included: Colorado Springs, Colorado; Pontiac, Michigan; Baltimore, Maryland; San Bernardino, California; and Gary, Indiana.

Volkswagen will also pay $2.7 billion for environmental mitigation and another $2 billion for clean-emissions infrastructure. Toward that end, Volkswagen formed a U.S. subsidiary called Electrify America, LLC., based in Reston, Virginia, that will manage the $2 billion brand-neutral zero-emission vehicle infrastructure programs and marketing campaigns for the next ten years. The group will get four installments of $500 million, at -year intervals, subject to California Air Resources Board and U.S. EPA approval. Volkswagen plans to install hundreds of chargers with 50, 150 and even some ultra-fast 320 kW charge rate, beginning in California in 2017. Competing charge networks (and automakers) saw the effort as controversial. In August 2018, Electrify America launched the first national media advertising campaign to promote electric vehicles; it featured the Chevy Bolt, with other EVs in cameo roles.

Securities and Exchange Commission lawsuit 
On 14 March 2019, the U.S. Securities and Exchange Commission filed a complaint against Volkswagen and its former CEO Martin Winterkorn alleging that they defrauded investors by selling corporate bonds and asset-backed securities while knowingly making false and misleading statements to government regulators, underwriters, and consumers as to the quality of their automobiles.

Private actions 
By 27 September 2015 at least 34 class-action lawsuits had been filed in the United States and Canada on behalf of Volkswagen and Audi owners, accusing Volkswagen of breach of contract, fraudulent concealment, false advertising, and violations of federal and state laws, and positing the "diminished value" of diesels that will be fixed to conform with pollution regulations, due to possible reductions in horsepower and fuel efficiency. According to Reuters, one reason class action lawyers were able to mobilize so fast is that the company's marketing to upscale professionals, including jurists, had backfired.

, at least one investor lawsuit seeking class action status for holders of Volkswagen American Depositary Receipts had been filed in the United States seeking compensation for the drop in stock value due to the emissions scandal.

On 7 October 2015, the Los Angeles Times reported that the number of class-action lawsuits filed had grown to more than 230.

On 19 November 2015, ABC News Australia reported that more than 90,000 VW, Audi and Skoda diesel vehicle owners had filed a class action lawsuit against Volkswagen in the country's Federal Court.

On 8 December 2015, the United States Judicial Panel on Multidistrict Litigation issued an order consolidating over 500 class actions against Volkswagen into a single multidistrict litigation, captioned In re: Volkswagen 'Clean Diesel' Marketing, Sales Practices, and Products Liability Litigation, MDL No. 2672, and transferred the entire MDL to Judge Charles R. Breyer of the federal district court for the Northern District of California.

On 21 January 2016, Judge Breyer held a hearing on the requests by over 150 plaintiff's attorneys for some kind of leadership role in the gigantic Volkswagen MDL, of which over 50 sought to serve as lead counsel or to chair the plaintiffs' steering committee. More than 100 of those attorneys tried to squeeze into his San Francisco courtroom to argue their requests in person, and some of them had to stand in the aisles or in the outside hallway. That afternoon, Judge Breyer issued an order naming 22 attorneys to a plaintiffs' steering committee, and of those, selected Elizabeth Cabraser of Lieff Cabraser as chair of the committee. On the other side, Volkswagen hired Robert Giuffra of Sullivan & Cromwell as its lead defense counsel in the MDL.

On 14 March 2016, Volkswagen AG was sued in Germany for allegedly failing to inform financial markets in a timely manner about defeat devices used in diesel engines. The suit on behalf of 278 institutional investors seeks  ( at March 2016 exchange rate) in compensation. BlackRock Inc., the world's largest asset manager, joined other institutional investors in the lawsuit in September 2016.

In November 2015, Moody's Investors Service downgraded Volkswagen's bond credit rating from A2 to A3. Fitch Ratings downgraded Volkswagen's Long-term Issuer Default Rating by two notches to BBB+, with a negative outlook.

In May 2016, The Children's Investment Fund Management, run by Chris Hohn and retaining a 2 percent stake in Volkswagen preference stock, launched a campaign aiming to overhaul the company's executive pay system, arguing that "for years management has been richly rewarded with massive compensation despite presiding over a productivity and profit collapse", thereby leading to an "aggressive management behavior" and contributing to the diesel emission scandal. Later the same month, German investor group DSW called for an independent audit of Volkswagen's emissions-cheating practices, arguing that the company's internal investigation might not necessarily make everything transparent to smaller shareholders.

On 28 June 2016, Volkswagen agreed to pay $15.3 billion to settle the various public and private civil actions in the United States, the largest settlement ever of an automobile-related consumer class action in United States history. On 25 October 2016, a U.S. federal judge approved the settlement. Up to $10 billion will be paid to 475,000 Volkswagen or Audi owners whose cars are equipped with 2.0-litre diesel engines. Owners can also opt to have their car repaired free of charge or can sell it back to the company, who will pay back its estimated value from before the scandal began. Leases can also be terminated without incurring penalty charges. Independent of which options are selected, owners will still receive compensation ranging from $5,000 to $10,000 per affected car. Additionally, should they choose to decline the offer, they are free to pursue independent legal action against the firm. The settlement also includes $2.7 billion for environmental mitigation, $2 billion to promote zero-emissions vehicles and $603 million for claims by 44 states, Washington, D.C., and Puerto Rico. Volkswagen agreed not to resell or export any vehicles it repurchases unless an approved emission repair has been completed. , no practical engineering solutions that would bring the vehicles into compliance with emission standards had been publicly identified. The consumer settlement will resolve all claims by participating consumers against Volkswagen and all its associates, except for any potential claims against Robert Bosch GmbH. Bosch supplied two exhaust treatment components and engine control software. In the case of 3.0-litre V6 TDI engines, Volkswagen suggested it can provide an uncomplicated fix that will bring the vehicles into compliance without adversely affecting performance, a move that the company hopes will avoid an expensive buyback of these cars.

European Investment Bank's possible involvement 

In January 2016, documents obtained by CEE Bankwatch Network provided more details for a European Investment Bank statement that its loans to Volkswagen may have been connected to the car makers use of cheating devices to rig emission tests. The 'Antrieb RDI' loan was supposedly for creating cleaner drive trains.

However, during the bank's annual press conference on 14 January 2016, the bank president, Werner Hoyer, admitted that the  loan might have been used in the creation of an emissions defeat device. Many redacted documents obtained by Bankwatch, along with the EIB not disclosing the details of the loan, hint to the bank possibly already knowing that there were some discrepancies with the 'Antrieb RDI' loan.

In 2017, the European Anti-Fraud Office (OLAF) found that Volkswagen had misled the bank about the car company's use of emissions cheating software, in a scandal that has become known as Dieselgate.

Also in 2017, Hoyer said the bank did not find "any indication" that its loans had been misused. However, six months later news website Politico reported that Olaf had concluded that Volkswagen acquired the EIB loan through "fraud" and "deception".

Models affected 

By 22 September 2015, Volkswagen had admitted that 11 million vehicles sold worldwide are affected in addition to the 480,000 vehicles with 2.0 L TDI engines sold in the US. According to Volkswagen, vehicles sold in other countries with the 1.6 L and 2.0 L 4-cylinder TDI engine known as Type EA189 are also affected. This software is also said to affect EA188 and the 2015 EA288 generation of the four-cylinder. Worldwide, around 1.2 million Skodas and 2.1 million Audis may contain the software, including TTs and Qs. 
VW states that Euro6 model in Germany are not affected, while 2015 US models with the same EA288 engines are affected. This suggests that normal-operation measurements that place the EA288  emissions between the two standards' limits were readily available at Volkswagen headquarters in Germany. According to Müller, the 1.2 and 2.0-litre models may be updated by software, whereas the around 3 million 1.6-litre require various hardware solutions, and some cars may even be replaced. The cars are so diverse that many different solutions are required.

Over one quarter of Volkswagen's sales in the US are diesel-powered vehicles. The corporation has chosen a market strategy that emphasizes clean diesel over electric cars or hybrid electric vehicles.

The vehicles affected by the recall in the US include the following model years:

2009–2015 Audi A3 2.0 L TDI
2009–2015 Volkswagen Beetle 2.0 L TDI
2009–2015 Volkswagen Beetle Convertible 2.0 L TDI
2009–2015 Volkswagen Golf 2.0 L TDI
2015 Volkswagen Golf Sportwagen 2.0 L TDI
2009–2015 Volkswagen Jetta 2.0 L TDI
2009–2014 Volkswagen Jetta Sportwagen 2.0 L TDI
2012–2015 Volkswagen Passat 2.0 L TDI

The EPA revealed on 2 November 2015 that Volkswagen had shipped additional diesel models with defeat devices, including the 2014 VW Touareg and the 2015 Porsche Cayenne. Model year 2016 Audi Quattro diesels were also found affected, including several 2016 Audi Quattro models (the 2016 Audi Quattro A6, A7, A8, A8L, and Q5). Cynthis Giles, the EPA Assistant Administrator for Office of Enforcement and Compliance Assurance, called out the company for further refusing to take responsibility for its failure to comply with the law. Under US federal Clean Air Act, Volkswagen could be liable for up to $375 million in fines.

Resale value 
, the resale value of affected model cars in the US was down from 5 to nearly 16 percent depending on model as compiled by Black Book and
Kelley Blue Book based on used car auction prices, the volume of which was also down.

Effects on Volkswagen corporate

Stock value 

On 21 September 2015, the first day of trading after the EPA's Notice of Violation to Volkswagen became public, share prices of Volkswagen AG fell 20 percent on the Frankfurt Stock Exchange. On 22 September, the stock fell another 12 percent. On 23 September, the stock quickly fell 10.5 percent, dropping below  to a record 4-year low before regaining some lost ground. Share prices of other German automakers were also affected, with BMW down 4.9 percent and Daimler down 5.8%. A year later Volkswagen stock was down by 30 percent.

Qatar, one of the biggest Volkswagen shareholders with a 17 percent stake in the company, lost nearly $5 billion as the company stock value fell.

Sales 
The US sale of Volkswagens was 23,882 vehicles in November 2015, a 24.7 percent decline from November 2014.

In Great Britain, the scandal did not affect sales, which increased in 2016 to an all-point high, placing Volkswagen second in the league of best-selling cars.

VW sales across Europe returned to growth in April 2016 for the first time since the scandal broke, with a group market share of 25.2 percent, compared to its previous level of 26.1 percent.

Transgressions by other manufacturers  

The Volkswagen scandal more generally raised awareness over the high levels of pollution being emitted by diesel vehicles built by a wide range of carmakers, including Volvo, Renault, Mercedes, Jeep, Hyundai, Citroen, BMW, Mazda, Fiat, Ford and Peugeot. Independent tests carried out by ADAC proved that, under normal driving conditions, diesel vehicles including the Volvo S60, Renault's Espace Energy and the Jeep Renegade, exceeded legal European emission limits for nitrogen oxide by more than 10 times. Researchers have criticized the inadequacy of current regulations and called for the use of a UN-sanctioned test called Worldwide harmonized Light vehicles Test Procedures that better reflects real-life driving conditions, as well as on-road emissions testing via PEMS. The two types of new test started to come into force in 2017, with critics saying that car firms have lobbied fiercely to delay their implementation, due to the high cost of meeting stricter environmental controls.

The Volkswagen scandal has increased scrutiny on combustion engines in general, and Volkswagen and several other car makes have been shown to pollute more than allowed. A French government report in 2016 investigated 86 different cars, and about 1/5th of those were found to comply with emission laws. Most did not. One car was measured to emit 17 times more than allowed. An overview of tests showed that cars turned off the exhaust improvement device in many ordinary conditions, with 5 out 38 cars complying with regulations in an English test. A German test showed 10 out of 53 cars compliant when exposed to temperatures below 10 degrees Celsius. A French test showed 4 out of 52 cars compliant when tested outside (not in a laboratory). A 2016 test showed Volkswagen diesel cars to emit at about twice the Euro6 limit, and several other manufacturers emitting more, up to 14 times higher.

As of March 2017, 38 out of 40 diesel cars of all brands tested by ADAC failed a -test based on government standards.

Industry consequences 
Renault believes that diesel cars would become significantly more expensive when re-engineered to comply with new emissions regulations as a result of the Volkswagen disclosures, to the point that diesel cars may not be competitive. Industry-wide, small diesel engines are being replaced by bigger ones, and electric car sales have risen.

Suzuki had won the case to terminate its partnership with Volkswagen at the International Court of Arbitration of the International Chamber of Commerce and dissolved the capital tie-up until September 2015, and was not involved in this scandal.

On 16 June 2016, Volkswagen announced plans to make major investments into the production of electric vehicles; Matthias Müller predicted that Volkswagen would introduce 30 all-electric models over the next 10 years, and that electric vehicles would account for around a quarter of its annual sales by 2025. Volkswagen plans to fund the initiative by streamlining its operations and engaging in cost-cutting. Müller stated that the changes would "require us – following the serious setback as a result of the diesel issue – to learn from mistakes made, rectify shortcomings and establish a corporate culture that is open, value-driven and rooted in integrity". Volkswagen plans a battery factory near Salzgitter to compensate for the reduced numbers of piston engines.

In November 2016, Volkswagen and its labour unions agreed to reduce the workforce by 30,000 people until 2021 as a result of the costs from the violations. However, 9,000 new jobs would come by producing more electric cars. Volkswagen CEO Herbert Diess stated to the German financial publication Handelsblatt that the company planned to stop marketing diesel models in the U.S., citing "the legal framework".

Secondary market consequences 
A study made by the researchers Prof. Itai Ater  from Tel Aviv University and Nir S. Yoseph, a Phd candidate from Tel Aviv University, explored the effect of the scandal on the secondary market in Israel. According to this study, which was publish at The Journal of Industrial Economics the Volkswagen emissions scandal had a statistically significant negative effect on the number of transactions in the secondary market involving the affected models (nearly -18 percent) and on their resale price (nearly -6 percent). The study also find that the reduction in the number of transactions was driven mostly by private sellers and that non-private sellers barely shied away from the market. These findings suggest that the supply of used cars among private sellers is much more elastic relative to the supply of used cars among non-private sellers. The authors of the study argue that lower willingness-to-pay and adverse selection following Dieselgate could also explain those results.

Other manufacturers 
After news broke out of Volkswagen cheating on diesel emissions, multiple other vehicle manufacturers got caught cheating on emissions in a similar manner. This included FCA (now a part of Stellantis), Opel (Under GM), Hino (subsidiary of Toyota), Mercedes-Benz, and BMW. Other manufacturers such as Nissan, Renault, Suzuki, Peugeot, Citroën, Mitsubishi, Hyundai, and Kia have been accused for cheating on emission tests.

Monkeygate 
In January 2018, it was revealed that Volkswagen had experimented on monkeys in May 2015 to prove that diesel exhaust was not harmful to primates. The disclosure of the tests was named Monkeygate. However, the test car was a Volkswagen Beetle fitted with the defeat device that produced far less emissions in the experiment than it would on the highway. Volkswagen's top lobbyist, Thomas Steg, was suspended on 23 January 2018.

Reactions

Political figures
German Chancellor Angela Merkel stated she hoped that all facts in the matter would be made known promptly, urging "complete transparency". She additionally noted that Germany's Transport Minister, Alexander Dobrindt, was in ongoing communication with Volkswagen.

Michel Sapin, the French Finance Minister, called for an investigation of diesel-powered cars that would encompass the entire continent of Europe.

Catherine Bearder, MEP for South East England, commented on 27 October 2015 in the European Parliament that "we now have the political momentum for a radical overhaul that will ensure carmakers cannot dodge the rules", defending an EU resolution meant to specifically "cut deadly pollution from diesel vehicles". However, when the European Commission proceeded with passing legislation that allowed the car industry more time to comply with the newer regulation, while also permitting cars, even under the more "realistic" tests, to emit more than twice the legal limit of nitrogen oxides from 2019 and up to 50 percent more from 2021, Bearder denounced the legislation as "a disgraceful stitch-up by national governments, who are once again putting the interests of carmakers ahead of public health".

London Assembly member Stephen Knight suggested on 1 November 2015 that diesel vehicles should either be banned in the future, or face stringent tests before being allowed to enter London's low-emissions zone. The city's deputy mayor for the environment, Matthew Pencharz, responded that such measures could lead to serious economic problems.

Automotive industry and other commentators
Major car manufacturers, including Toyota, GM, PSA Peugeot Citroen, Renault, Mazda, Daimler (Mercedes Benz), and Honda, issued press statements reaffirming their vehicles' compliance with all regulations and legislation for the markets in which they operate; The Society of Motor Manufacturers and Traders described the issue as affecting "just one company", with no evidence to suggest that the whole industry might be affected.

Renault-Nissan CEO Carlos Ghosn said it would be difficult for an automaker to conceal internally an effort to falsify vehicle emissions data, such as has happened at Volkswagen AG: "I don't think you can do something like this hiding in the bushes."

Jim Holder, the editorial director of Haymarket Automotive, which publishes WhatCar and AutoCar, opined that there had never been a scandal in the automotive industry of this size.

A commentary in Spiegel Online argued that the Volkswagen scandal will affect the entire German industry, and that German companies operating abroad will face a decrease in competitiveness.

Alan Brown, chairman of the Volkswagen National Dealer Advisory Council, commented on the scandal's negative impact on US dealers, who were already struggling with overpriced products and a deteriorating relationship between the company and the dealer body. Car and Driver similarly emphasized Volkswagen's inability to efficiently operate in the US market, while also suggesting that the company had grossly underestimated the EPA's power, and inexplicably failed to go public before the story broke, despite receiving ample warning.

Tesla Motors CEO Elon Musk was asked about his opinion whether the scandal will weaken the consumer's view on green technologies; he responded saying he expects the opposite to happen: "What Volkswagen is really showing is that we've reached the limit of what's possible with diesel and petrol. The time has come to move to a new generation of technology."

Similarly, analysts at Fitch suggested the Volkswagen diesel emissions crisis was likely to affect the entire automotive industry, with petrol cars potentially enjoying a revival in Europe and greater investment being poured into electric vehicles. Other commentators argued that the diesel engine will nevertheless regain its footing in the market, due to its international indispensability, low  emissions and strong presence in the US pickup– and commercial–truck segments.

On 29 September 2015, S&P Dow Jones Indices and RobecoSAM stated that Volkswagen AG's stock will be de-listed from the Dow Jones Sustainability indexes after close of trading on 5 October 2015. Among the reasons for the de-listing, the statement issued by RobecoSAM cited social and ethical reasons, and confirmed that Volkswagen will no longer be identified as an Industry Group Leader in the "Automobiles & Components" industry group.

In early October, Green Car Journal rescinded its Green Car of the Year awards, for models that "best raise the bar in environmental performance", that were given to the 2009 Volkswagen Jetta TDI and 2010 Audi A3 TDI models.

In December 2015, a group of business and environmental leaders, including Tesla CEO Elon Musk, addressed an open letter to CARB, urging the agency to absolve Volkswagen of recalling the 85,000 diesel vehicles affected by the scandal in the US, and argued that Volkswagen should instead be asked to allocate resources to an accelerated rollout of zero-emissions vehicles ("cure the air, not the cars"). The letter, which includes a 5-step legally enforceable plan, argues that this course of action could result in a "10 for 1 or greater reduction in pollutant emissions as compared to the pollution associated with the diesel fleet cheating", while suggesting that the affected vehicles on the road in California "represent an insignificant portion of total vehicles emissions in the State" and "do not, individually, present any emissions-related risk to their owners or occupants". Similar requests were put forward by the American Lung Association, who petitioned the EPA to determine Volkswagen to promote zero-emissions vehicles, build sustainable transport infrastructure and retrofit older diesel models with superior emissions controls.

Volkswagen got a 2016 Ig Nobel Prize in chemistry from the scientific humor magazine Annals of Improbable Research for "solving the problem of excessive automobile pollution emissions by automatically, electromechanically producing fewer emissions whenever the cars are being tested".

Media 
The Volkswagen TDI emissions scandal has received widespread negative media exposure, with headlines fronting the websites of multiple news gathering and reporting organizations. Reuters said that the crisis at Volkswagen could be a bigger threat to the German economy than the consequences of the 2015 Greek sovereign debt default. Deutsche Welle, one of Germany's state broadcasters, said that a "lawsuit tsunami" was headed for Volkswagen and that the scandal had dealt a blow to the country's psyche and "Made in Germany" brand. Popular Mechanics said that the scandal "is much worse than a recall", highlighting that Volkswagen had engaged in a pattern of "cynical deceit".

The Volkswagen emissions cheating scandal has joined the ranks of other -gate suffix stories, with media coining both Dieselgate and Emissionsgate to describe it.

Public polling 
Despite the scandal, one poll conducted for Bild suggested that the majority of Germans (55 percent) still have "great faith" in Volkswagen, with over three-quarters believing that other carmakers are equally guilty of manipulation. Similarly, a poll conducted by the management consultancy Prophet in October 2015 indicated that two-thirds of Germans believe the scandal to be exaggerated and continue to regard Volkswagen as a builder of "excellent cars". A survey by Northwestern University's Kellogg School of Management, Brand Imperatives and Survata said that nearly 50 percent of US consumers had either a positive or very positive impression of Volkswagen, while 7.5 percent had a "very negative" impression. Another US survey by market researcher AutoPacific found that 64 percent of vehicle owners do not trust Volkswagen and only 25 percent of them have a positive view of Volkswagen following the scandal.

See also 
 Exhaust gas recirculation
 FTP-75
 
 NOx adsorber
 Vehicle regulation

Notes

Citations

Further reading

External links 
 
EPA Notice of Violation
State of California EPA In-Use Compliance Letter 
VW diesel official FAQ
Written Testimony of Michael Horn, CEO of Volkswagen Group of America Before the U.S. House Committee on Energy and Commerce, 8 October 2015
 Analysis of the emission scandal from a procedural, organizational and technical level: The exhaust emissions scandal ("Dieselgate"), talk at 2015 Chaos Communication Congress.
U.S. v. Volkswagen AG, Complaint, Filed 4 January 2016

Infographic – simple overview

2015 in the environment
2015 in technology
2015 in transport
2015 scandals
Cheating in business
Corporate scandals
Emission standards
Emissions reduction
Environmental controversies
Fraud in the European Union
Fraud in the United States
History of the diesel engine
Scandals in Germany
Scandals in the United States
Conspiracy to defraud the United States case law
Regulatory compliance
2015 in Germany
2015 in the United States
Emissions violations
Emissions violations
Regulation in Germany